Manurewa East School is a Primary School (years 1–6) in Manurewa, a suburb of Manukau City, Auckland Region, New Zealand.

Principals
 1999–Present - Phil Palfrey

References

Primary schools in Auckland